is a 2015 novel by . It tells of a café in Tokyo that allows its customers to travel back in time, as long as they return before their coffee gets cold.

Summary 
In a narrow back alley in Tokyo lies a café called Funiculi Funicula. In the café, customers have the opportunity to travel back to a time of their choosing, as long as they follow a long list of rules. There is only one seat in the café that allows time travel; the seat is only available when the ghost that usually occupies it goes for a toilet break; once back in time, customers can't leave the seat; the only people in the past who can be met are people who have visited the café; whatever happens in the past, the present won't change; and, most importantly, the customer has to return to the present before their cup of coffee goes cold.

The novel follows the stories of the café staff, notably barista Kazu, and four different customers. The first, a businesswoman named Fumiko, tries to repair her relationship with her boyfriend after he left the country for a job in the United States. The second, a nurse named Kohtake, tries to find a letter her Alzheimer-stricken husband wrote. The third, a bar owner named Hirai, tries to talk to her sister whom she's been avoiding. The fourth, one of the café co-owners named Kei, tries to go to the future to talk to her unborn daughter.

History 
The story originally began as a play, before being adapted into a novel in 2015. The novel was then translated into English by Geoffrey Trousselot. In 2017, a sequel was released: Before the Coffee Gets Cold: Tales from the Café, and a second sequel Before Your Memory Fades was released in 2022.

In 2018, the novel was adapted into the film Cafe Funiculi Funicula, starring Kasumi Arimura.

In October 2021, it was announced that SK Global and The Jackal Group to develop, finance and produce a television series adaptation of the novel.

Reception 
Terry Hong of The Christian Science Monitor stated that the "narrative is occasionally uneven and tends to meander" but that the author "has a surprising, unerring ability to find lasting emotional resonance." Ian J. Battaglia of the Chicago Review of Books wrote that "despite the occasional clumsiness, the narrative is deeply moving" and that the "characters are the real stars here, and their empathy for one another is powerful." Courtney Rodgers of Book Riot compared the book to American comedy series Pushing Daisies, stating that the "charming short novel asks questions about time and how we choose to spend it."

Joseph P. Kelly of The Harvard Crimson gave the book five stars.

References

External links
 Before the Coffee Gets Cold - Pan Macmillan
 Before the Coffee Gets Cold official website 
2015 Japanese novels
ja:コーヒーが冷めないうちに